The 2013–14 HRV Twenty20 (named after the competition's sponsor HRV) was the ninth season of the Men's Super Smash Twenty20 cricket tournament in New Zealand. The competition ran from 1 November 2013 to 18 January 2014. The tournament was won by the Northern Knights for the first time, after they defeated Otago Volts in the final by five wickets.

Points table

 Teams qualified for the finals

Finals

Preliminary Final

Final

References

External links
 Series home at ESPN Cricinfo

New Zealand domestic cricket competitions
Super Smash (cricket)